LibreOffice Calc is the spreadsheet component of the LibreOffice software package.

After forking from OpenOffice.org in 2010, LibreOffice Calc underwent a massive re-work of external reference handling to fix many defects in formula calculations involving external references, and to boost data caching performance, especially when referencing large data ranges.

Calc is capable of opening and saving most spreadsheets in Microsoft Excel file format. Calc is also capable of saving spreadsheets as PDF files.

As with the entire LibreOffice suite, Calc is available for a variety of platforms, including Linux, macOS, Microsoft Windows, and FreeBSD. Available under the Mozilla Public License, Calc is free and open-source software. There are community builds for many other platforms. Ecosystem partner Collabora uses LibreOffice upstream code and provides apps for Android, iOS, iPadOS and ChromeOS. LibreOffice Online is an online office suite which includes the applications Writer, Calc and Impress and provides an upstream for projects such as commercial Collabora Online.

There is now a closed beta of LibreOffice on AmigaOS 4.1.

Features
Capabilities of Calc include:
 Ability to read/write OpenDocument (ODF), Microsoft Excel (XLSX), CSV, and several other formats.
 Support for many functions, including those for imaginary numbers, as well as financial and statistical functions.
 Supports 1,048,576 rows and 16384 columns in a spreadsheet, making LibreOffice spreadsheets more suitable for heavier scientific or financial spreadsheets. Version 7.0 introduced "very large spreadsheets" which can be enabled as an experimental feature.  Version 7.4 made very large spreadsheets default.
Up to now, new functions such as IFS, Switch TEXT JOIN, MAXIFS, MINIFS functions, etc. were available only in Excel 2016 and later. LibreOffice Calc can use them.

Pivot Table
Originally called DataPilot, Pivot Table provides similar functionality to the Pivot table found in Microsoft Excel. It is used for interactive table layout and dynamic data analysis.

An advanced sort macro is included that allows data to be arranged or categorised based on either a user generated macro or one of several default included macros.

Supported file formats

Release history
Calc has continued to diverge since the fork from its parent OpenOffice with new features being added and code cleanups taking place.

Versions for LibreOffice Calc include the following:

See also

 LibreOffice Writer
 List of spreadsheet software
 Comparison of spreadsheet software

References

External links

 

Cross-platform free software
Free spreadsheet software
Calc
Spreadsheet software
Spreadsheet software for macOS
Spreadsheet software for Windows